David Poisson (31 March 1982  – 13 November 2017) was a French World Cup alpine ski racer, who specialized in the speed events. He made his World Cup debut in 2004. Poisson represented France at the 2010 Winter Olympics in Vancouver, where he placed 7th in the downhill. At the 2013 World Championships, Poisson made his first podium in top-level competition, taking bronze in the downhill. In 2015, Poisson took his only World Cup podium in a downhill in Santa Caterina, finishing third.

Poisson died in a crash during training in Canada, at Nakiska near Calgary, on 13 November 2017. He caught an edge, went through the safety netting, and struck

World Cup results

Top ten finishes

 1 podium – (1 DH)

Season standings

World Championship results

Olympic results

References

External links

 
 David Poisson World Cup standings at the International Ski Federation
 
 French Ski Team – 2016 men's A team 
 David Poisson at Salomon Racing
 
 
 
  

1982 births
2017 deaths
French male alpine skiers
Olympic alpine skiers of France
Alpine skiers at the 2010 Winter Olympics
Alpine skiers at the 2014 Winter Olympics
Sportspeople from Annecy
Skiing deaths
Sport deaths in Canada